Mulona barnesi is a moth of the subfamily Arctiinae first described by William Dewitt Field in 1952. It is found on Cuba.

References

Moths described in 1952
Lithosiini
Endemic fauna of Cuba